Drury Melone (1833-1903) was a California politician who served as the 11th California Secretary of State and a Presidential Elector. Melone was a stockholder of the Union Pacific Railroad and also owned and operated the St. George Hotel in Sacramento, California.

References 

1833 births
1903 deaths
California Republicans
Secretaries of State of California